The 1934 Peruvian Soccer Championship had nine participating teams. The champion of this tournament was Club Universitario de deportes. The season's top scorers were Teodoro Fernández Meyzán and Jorge "Campolo" Alcalde, both with 10 goals. In this way, "Lolo" Fernández managed for the first time to be the top scorer in the Peruvian First Division for three consecutive years, a record he holds together with Valeriano López.

There is controversy about this championship regarding the team that should have been awarded the title. Some argue that the champion should have been Alianza Lima, while others argue that the title should have gone to Universitario de Deportes.

The controversy arose when Alianza Lima managed to beat Universitario de Deportes on the last date by a quarter of a point, thanks to the bonus granted by the Reserves Tournament that was played at that time in parallel to the First Teams Tournament. Universitario's directors challenged the result, as they considered it unfair to lose the championship by a quarter of a point from a secondary tournament (Reserves Tournament). Even though this was the format for the previous 4 years, and every team was in accordance. But in response, the sports authorities ordered an extra match to be played. The question arises as to the nature of this extra match. The official bodies indicate that the authorities would have declared the tournament tied, and thus the extra match, in which they were victorious, would have given them the Absolute Title. For its part, Club Alianza Lima claims that Universitario's claims were not upheld, so the extra match would never have defined the main title but a secondary one. There is a formal complaint from Alianza Lima to the Peruvian Soccer Federation.

Regardless of this discussion, the Peruvian Football Federation and the Professional Football Sports Association officially recognize Universitario as the first team champions that year, however the national championship was awarded to Alianza Lima. This distinction is important, because the reserves gave the extra points necessary for Alianza Lima to be champions of the tournament. While the extra match was made to break the tie of the first teams, it awarded no extra points, as this match was played on 7 July 1935.
 
Alianza Lima still claims to be the champion, and today there is an ongoing effort by its supporters to get the title recognized to Alianza Lima, according to their own recent investigations and the official resolutions that were published on the newspapers of the time. However, the Peruvian Football Federation and the Sports Association of Professional Football, both recognize the first team title of this year belong to Universitario. Furthermore, in 2012 the FIFA published an external article in which Universitario appears holding the 1934 championship. In 2013, Alianza Lima sent a formal claim to the Peruvian Soccer Federation to rectify the list of winners, still without an official response.

Circolo Sportivo Italiano disbanded after 3 matches. Hence, their 5 remaining matches were awarded to their opponents, Circolo gaining 0 pts. No team was promoted and First Division was reduced to 5 teams for 1935.

Format
 From 1931 until 1934 the results of a reserve teams league were added as bonus points.
 From 1931 until 1942 the points system was  W:3, D:2, L:1, walkover:0.

Results

Standings

First Teams Tiebreaker

References

External links
Peru 1934 season at RSSSF
Peruvian Football League News 

Peru1
Peruvian Primera División seasons
1934 in Peruvian football